FRAZ: Frauenzeitung was a feminist magazine published in Zurich, Switzerland, from 1976 to 2009. It was one of the early feminist publications in German-speaking countries and was the first feminist magazine in Switzerland.

History and profile
The magazine was started in 1976 as the official organ of the Women's Liberation Movement (FBB - Frauenbefreiungsbewegung). It was first named Fraue-Zitig. Later it appeared as an unaffiliated publication. The magazine was published quarterly and covered articles about politics, culture, and society. The headquarters of the magazine was in Zurich.

The magazine was the recipient of the 2001 Equality Award by the city of Zurich. FRAZ: Frauenzeitung ceased publication in 2009 due to financial challenges. The last issue appeared in September 2009.

See also
 List of magazines in Switzerland

References

1976 establishments in Switzerland
2009 disestablishments in Switzerland
Alternative magazines
Defunct magazines published in Switzerland
Defunct political magazines
Feminism in Switzerland
Feminist magazines
German-language magazines
Magazines established in 1976
Magazines disestablished in 2009
Magazines published in Zürich
Political magazines published in Switzerland
Quarterly magazines published in Switzerland
Women's magazines published in Switzerland